This list of French words of Germanic origin consists of Standard Modern French words and phrases deriving from any Germanic language of any period.

Scope
The following list details words, affixes and phrases that contain Germanic etymons. 

Words where only an affix is Germanic (e.g. méfait, bouillard, carnavalesque) are excluded, as are words borrowed from a Germanic language where the origin is other than Germanic, (for instance, cabaret is from Dutch, but the Dutch word is ultimately from Latin/Greek, so it is omitted). 

Likewise, words which have been calqued from a Germanic tongue (e.g. pardonner, bienvenue, entreprendre, toujours, compagnon, plupart, manuscrit, manoeuvre), or which received their usage or sense (i.e. were created, modified or influenced) due to Germanic speakers or Germanic linguistic habits (e.g. comté, avec, commun, on, panne, avoir, ça) are not included.

Many other Germanic words found in older versions of French, such as Old French and Anglo-French are no longer extant in Standard Modern French. Many of these words do, however, continue to survive dialectally and in English. See: List of English Latinates of Germanic origin.

List

C
cabot "dog" ( alt. of clabaud "loud barking dog" < claber < Gmc, cf Dut kabbard "chatterer")
cafignon ( < Frk *kaf "thimble" < Gmc, cf Germ Kaff "ball, lump of dough", Fr eschafillon "nutshell")
cague ( < Dut kaghe, kaag < Gmc)
cahot
cahoteux
cahoter "to jolt" ( < Frk *hottōn, hottisōn "to shake" < Gmc, cf Dut hotten "to shake")
cahot
cahotage
cahotant
cahoté
cahotement
cahute "hut, ship's cabin" ( < Du kajuit)
caille "quail" ( < OFr quaille < ML quaquila, quaccula < Frk *kwakkula < Gmc, cf MDu kwackele, OHG quahtala "quail")
caillebotter (also cailleboter) ( < caille + botter < Gmc)
cailleboté (also cailleboté)
caillebotis (also caillebotis)
caillebotte
caillou "flint, stone, pebble" ( < Dut kai, kei "stone" < Gmc, cf Germ kiesel "stone, pebble")
caillouteux
cailloutage
caillouter
cailloutis
caillouter
caillouté
cajute
cake
cake-walk
cale "wedge, support" ( < Germ Keil < Gmc)
cale-pied
caler "to support, steady, fix"
décaler
caler
calé
calée
calance (also calence)
calage
calfeutrer
calfeutrage
calfeutrement
caliborgne
caliborgnon
calot "nut" ( < écale < Frk *skala < Gmc)
cambrousse (also cambrouse)
cambrousard
cambrousarde
cambrousier
cambuse "(naut.) cook's room" ( < Eng caboose < Gmc)
cambusier
came ( < Germ Kamm "comb" < Gmc)
camembert
camerlingue
camerlinguat
camion-stop
camisard
camoufler "to camouflage" ( < Ital camuffare "to disguise" + MFr camoufflet "puff of smoke" < MFr moufflet < Germ Muffel < Gmc)
camouflage
camoufle
camouflet
camoufleur
camoufleuse
canamelle
canard "drake, male duck" ( < OFr quanart < quane "little boat" < Gmc + -art, -ard < Gmc, cf Germ kahn "floater, little boat")
canarder
canardière
canardeau
canardier
cane
canarder
canardement
canasson
cancan
cancanage
cancaner
cancanier
cancanière
cane "duck" ( < OFr quane "little boat" < Gmc, cf Germ kahn "floater, little boat")
caner
canette
caneton
cannot
canesou (also canezou)
canette ( < cane < OFr quane < Gmc)
canette "beer-jug" ( < Fr cane < Germ kanne "a can" < Gmc *kanna)
canon
canif "penknife" ( < OFr < Frk *knīf and ON knífr < Gmc *knībaz "knife")
cannot "canoe, little boat"
canotage
canoter
canotier
canotière
cap-hornier
capre
caquer "to cure (fish)" ( < OFr quaquer < MDu kaaken)
caque
caquage
caqueur
caqûre
encaquer
caquelon
caqueter "to cackle" ( < Gmc, cf ME cakelen, Du kakelen, MLG kākeln, Swed kackla)
caquet
caquetage
caquetant
caquète
caqueterie
caqueteur
caqueteuse
caquetoire
caquette
carapater
carapate (also carapata)
carapatin
carcan "pillory" ( < OFr quercant < Gmc, cf OHG querca "throat")
cargo-boat
cargo-stop
carle
carlin "a pug, pug dog" ( < Carolinus < Gmc)
carlingue
carlingage
carlisme
carliste
carolus
carolin
caroline
carolingien
carolingienne
carolingisme
carpe "carp"
carpé
carpeau (also carpiau)
carpillon
casse "crucible" ( < LL caza < OHG kezi "stove")
casseau
casse-pattes
casserole
casserole "saucepan"
casserolée
Catalan
catalane
catgut
cauchemar "nightmare" ( < cauche- "to press" + mar "demon, mare" < Gmc, cf Germ Nachtmar "nightmare")
cauchemarder
cauchemaresque
cauchemarder
cauchemardant
cauchemardante
cauchemardesque (also cauchemaresque)
cent-garde
cep "stock" ( < Lat cippus "stake, beam" < Gmc, cf OE cipp "beam, chip of wood", Dut kip "strip of wood")
cepage
cèpe
cépée
receper
chabraque "cloths laid on a cavalry horse"
chadburn
chagrin "sorrow, affliction"
chagriner
chagriner
chagrinant
chagriné
chainse
chairman
chalon
chaloupe "shallop"
chalouper
chaloupier
chalouper
chaloupé
chambellan "chamberlain"
chambellage
chambranler
chambranle
chambrelan
chamois "chamois"
chamoiser
chamoisine
chamoiser
chamoisage
chamoisé
chamoiserie
chamoiseur
chanlatte
charlemagne
charlemagne faire
charleston
charlot
charlotte
charlotte
charlottine
charolais (also charollais)
charolaise (also charollaise)
chasse-bosses
chasse-marée
chat "trade ship"
chatte
chat-huant "screech owl"
chatiron (ceramics) ( < Germ Schattierung "nuance" < Gmc)
chatironner
chatironner
chatironné
chatterton
chaton "bezel"
chatouiller "to tickle" ( < ML *catilare, cattuliare "to tickle" < Gmc, cf OHG kizzilōn "to tickle", Dut katelen, kietelen "to tickle", ON kitla, OE citelan "to kittle, tickle")
chausse-trappe "caltrop"
chelem
chemise "chemise, shirt" ( < OFr chamisae < Lat camisia < Gmc *khamiþi-, cf OHG hamidi, hemidi "shirt", OE hemeþe "shirt"; cf OIr caimis & Welsh camse from the same Gmc source)
chemiser
chemiserie
chemisette
chemisier
chemisière
chemiser
chemisage
chenapan "scamp"
chewing-gum
chic "chic, elegant, stylish" ( < Fr < Germ schick "skill" < Gmc)
chiquement
chicaner
chicane
chicanerie
chicaneur
chicaneuse
chicanier
chicard
chiche
chicoter
chicot
chicote
chicotte
chiffe "rag" ( < chiffre "worthless thing" < OFr chipe < ME chippe "chip, shard, small piece" < OE cipp < Gmc, cf MLG & MDu kippen "to chip eggs, hatch")
chiffon
chiffon
chiffonner
chiffonnier
chiffonnière
chiffonner
chiffonnable
chiffonnade
chiffonnage
chiffonnant
chiffonné
chiffonnerie
chigner
chiner
chine
chiné
chinée
chipe
chiper
chipette
chipoter
chiper
chiperie
chipeur
chipeuse
chipie
chipoter
chipotage
chipoterie
chipoteur
chipoteuse
chipotier
chipotière
chips
chiquage
chique "ball, game ball" ( < Germ dial Schick "ball" from schicken "to send" < Gmc)
chiquenaude
chiquenaude
chiquenauder
chiquer "to chew" ( < Germ schicken "to deliver blows", lit "to send" < Gmc)
chique
chiqué
chiquet
chiquer ( < chic < Gmc)
chiquement
chiquet
chiqueter
choc "shock, jolt"
chocotte
choisir "to choose"
choisi
choisie
choix
choisisseuse
choisisseur
chope "beer glass"
chopine
choper
chopine
chopiner
chopper "to stumble"
chopin
choquer "to shock, jolt"
choc
choquable
choquant
choqué
choquement
chouan
chouanner
chouannerie
chouc
choucas "daw, jackdaw"
choucroute "sauerkraut"
chouette "owl, owlet"
chouque
chouquet
cible "target"
cingler "to sail"
cinglage
cinglant
cinglante
cinglé
cippe
ciron
cironné
cironnée
clabaud "liar"
clabauder
clabauder
clabaudage
clabauderie
clabaudeur
clabaudeuse
clabot (also crabot)
clabotage
claboter
clac
clam
clamecer (also clamser)
clamp
clampage
clamper
clampin
clamser (also cramser, crampser)
clan (also clamp)
clapet "valve"
clapir
clapier
clapoter "to clap, chop, splash"
clapot
clapotage
clapotant
clapotement
clapotis
clapper "to clap"
clappement
claque "smack, slap"
claque-bois
claque-bosse
claque-dent
claque-des-genoux
claque-faim
claque-merde
claque-oreille
claque-patin (also claque-patins)
claque-soif
claquedent
claquemurer
claquer
claquage
claquemurer
claquemuré
claquer
claquant
claqué
claquement
claqueur
claquet
claquette
claquoir
claquet
claqueter
clatir
clenche
clic
cliche
clichage
clicher "to stereotype"
cliche
cliché
clichement
clicherie
clicheur
client-relais
clifoire
clin
clinfoc
clinquant "tinsel"
clip
clipper
cliquart
clique
cliquer (doublet of clicher) "to stereotype"
cliques
cliquet
cliquette
cliqueter "to click, clack"
cliquètement
cliquettement
cliquetis
clisse
clissage
clisser
cliver "to cleave" ( < Eng "cleave" < Gmc)
clivable
clivage
cliveur
cloche "bell"
cloche-pied
clochard
clocher
clochement
clocher-porche
clochette
clocheter
clochard
clocharde
clochardiser
clochardiser
clochardisation
clocher
clochant
clocheter
clocheton
clochetonné
clocheteur
cobalt "cobalt"
cocagne "cockayne"
cocarde "cockade"
clopée
clopiner
clopin-clopant
clopinement
cloque
cloquage
cloquer
cloquer
cloqué
clown
clownerie
clownesque
club
clubiste
clubman
coachman
cob
cobalt
cobourgeois
cocagne
cocard (also coquard)
cocarde
cocardeau (also coquardeau)
cocarder
cocarderie
cocardier
cocardière
cocardisme
cocasse
cocasse
cocassement
cocasserie
cocassier
cocâtre
coche ("bad lesson")
cochet
cochevis
cocker
cockney
cockpit
cocktail
coiffe "cap, headdress" ( < OFr < LL cofia, cofea "helmet" < Frk *kufja, kuffja < Gmc, cf MHG kupfe "cap")
coiffage
coiffer
coiffette
coiffière
coiffis
décoiffer
coiffer
coiffant
coiffé
coiffeur
coiffeuse
coiffure
coke "coke, coal by-product"
coke
cokerie
cokier
colbertisme
colbertiste
cold-cream
colimaçon
colin
colin-tampon
colistier
colt
coltis
colza "rapeseed"
combuger
condom ( < Eng < Ital < Gmc)
contre-attaque
contre-attaquer
contre-bouter
contre-choc
contre-danse
contre-digue
contre-espion
contre-espionnage
contre-garde
contre-guet
contre-hacher
contre-haut (also contre-haut en)
contre-hermine
contre-heurtoir
contre-latte
contre-tirer
contrebande
contrebandier
contrebandière
contrebord (also contrebord à)
contrebuche
contrebuter
contrechoc
contredanse
contredanser
contreguérilla
contremarche
contremarque
contremarquer
contreplaqué
contrescarpe
contresens
coq "cock"
coq-à-l'âne
coquard
coquarde (also cocarde)
coquardeau
coquart
coquassier
coquâtre
coquelicot
coqueret (watchmaking term)
coquet (also cochet)
coqueter
coquetier
coquette
coqueleur
coquebin
coquebine
coqueleux
coquelicot
coqueliner
coquelourde
coquelle
coqueron ("cook-room")
coquet "cockerel"
coquetage
coqueter
coquettement
coquetterie
coquet "coquettish"
coquetage
coqueter
coquettement
coquetterie
coquin "scoundrel"
coquine
coquinement
coquinerie
coquinet
coquinette
corned-beef
cornemuser
cornemuse
cornemuseur
cornemuseux
corroyer "to curry (leather)"
corroi
corroierie
corroyage
corroyeur
cosse "shell, husk, pod" ( < Gmc, cf Germ Schote "pod", Dut schosse)
cossette
cossu
cossue
écosser
cosy
cosy-corner
cotereaux
coterie "coterie"
cotidal
cotillon "petticoat"
cotillonner
cotillonner
cotillonneur
cotillonneuse
cotre
cottage
cotte "coat"
cotte-hardie
cottereaux (also cotereaux)
cotteron
cottille
cottillon
couque ("cake")
courte-botte
couvre-guidon
couvre-képi
couvre-poche
cover-coat (also covercoat)
cover-girl
cow-boy
cow-pox
crabe "crab"
crabier
crevette
crabot
crabotage
crac "crack"
craquer
cracher "to spit"
crachement
crachat
craché
cracheur
cracheuse
crachin
crachis
crachoir
crachoter
crachouiller
crachoter
crachotement
crack
cracking
crailler
craillement
cramique
crampe "cramp"
crampser (also cramser)
crampon "cramp-iron"
cramponner
cramponnet
cramponner
cramponnement
cran
créner
cranter
cranequin
cranequinier
cranter
crantage
crapahut
crapahuter
crapaud "toad"
crapauderie
crapaudière
crapaudine
crapoussin
craper "to creep"
crapette
crapouiller
crapouillage
crapouilleur
crapouillot
crapouillot
crapouillotage
crapouilloter
crapouilloteur
craquer "to crack"
craquant
craque
craqué
craqueler
craquelin
craquement
craquerie
craqueter
craqueur
craqueuse
craqueler
craquelage
craquelé
craquelée
craquèlement
craquellement
craquelure
craquelin
craquelot
craqueter
craquètement
crawl
crawler
crawler
crawlé
crawleur
crawleuse
crayon-feutre
crayon-marqueur
crèche "crib"
crécher
crémaillère "pothook"
crémaillon
créner
créneau
crénelé
créneler
creps ("craps")
créquier
créseau
cresson "watercress"
cressonnière
creton "indent" ( < MDu kerte)
crevette "shrimp"
criailler
criaillement
criaillerie
criailleur
criailleuse
cric "screw-jack"
cric-crac
cricket
cricri (also cri-cri)
crier ( < ML crīdāre < Frk *krītan "to proclaim, cry out" < Gmc *krītanan, cf MDu krīten, MHG krīzen, Dut krijten "to cry")
cri
criage
criailler
criant
criard
criarde
criée
crierie
crieur
crieuse
crique "creek"
criquer
criquet "cricket"
crisser
crissant
crissement
croasser "to croak"
croassant
croassement
croasseur
croc "hook"
croc-en-jambe
croche
croche-pied
crochet
crochu
croché
accrocher
décrocher
crochet "small hook"
crochetage
crocheter
crocheteur
crochu "hooked"
cromorne
croquer "to crunch"
croquant
croquante
croque-au-sel (also croque-au-sel à la)
croque-mitaine (also croquemitaine)
croque-monsieur
croque-mort (also croquemort)
croque-note (also croquenote)
croquenot
croquet
croquette
croqueur
croqueuse
croquis
croquignole
croquignolet
croquis "sketch"
crosse
crosser
crossette
crosser
crossé
crosses
crosseur
crotte "mud"
crotter
décrotter
crottin
crotter
crotté
crouler (sound) ( < MDu grollen < Gmc)
croulant
croulante
croule
croulement
croulier
croup "croup" ( < Eng croup < Gmc)
croupal
croupe "rump"
croupetons (also croupetons à)
croupière
croupion
croupier
croupir
croupon
croupier "croupier"
croupion "rump"
croupionner
croupir "to stagnate"
croupi
croupissant
croupissement
croupissoir
croupissure
crown-glass
cruchade
cruche
cruchon
cryptopetit-bourgeois
cuffat
cul-blanc
culbuter
culbute
culbuté
culbuteur
culbutis
culotte-short
cupro-nickel (also cupronickel)
cupro-potassique (also cupropotassique)
cutter "cutter"

D
dahlia "dahlia"
dail
dailler
dalle
dallage
daller
dalot
daller
dallé
daltonien
daltonisme
dame "dam"
damer
damage
dameret
damier
dancing
dandin
dandine
dandiner
dandiner
dandinement
dandinette
dandy "dandy"
dandysme
danois ( < Frk *danisk < Gmc)
danoise
danser "to dance" ( < OFr dancer, dancier < Frk *dansjan, dansōn < Gmc *þen- to stretch, cf OHG dansōn to stretch out, stretch out the arms as if motioning)
dansable
dansant
danse
danseur
danseuse
dansoter (also dansotter)
contredans
dard "dart"
darder
dare-dare (also dare dare)
darne ("stunned") ( < Frk *darn "dumbfounded" < Gmc)
daron
daronne
darwinien
darwinienne
darwinisme
darwiniste
daube
dauber
daubière
dauber "to cuff"
daubeur
dead-heat
débâcher
débâcler ( < dé- + bâcler < Du bakkelen < MDu bakken "to adhere" < Gmc)
débâcle
déballer "to unpack"
déballage
déballé
déballement
déballeur
débander "to disband"
débandade
débandement
débanquer
débarder "to unload"
débardage
débardeur "unloader, lighterman"
débâtir
débaucher ("to debauch")
débauchage
débauché
débauchée
débaucheur
débaucheuse
déblayer "to clear, grow corn"
déblai
déblaiement
déblayage
déblayé
déblayeur
débleuir
débloquer ("to erect a blockade")
déblocage
déboiser
déboisage
déboisé
déboisement
débonder
débondage
débondement
débondonner
déborder "to overflow, overreach"
débord
débordant
débordé
débordement
débosseler
débotter
débotté
débotteler
déboucher
débouchage
débouché
débouchement
débouchoir
debout "on end"
débouter "to nonsuit"
déboutonner
déboutonnage
déboutonné
débrayer
débredouiller
débrider
débridé
débridement
débringuer
débringué
débris "debris"
débrouiller
débrouillage
débrouillard
débrouillardise
débrouille
débrouilleur
débrouilleuse
débrousser
débroussaillement
débroussailler
débroussailleur
débroussailleuse
débucher "to break cover"
débuché
débusquer "to expel, drive out"
débuter "to debut" ( dé- + but "goal, target" < OFr but, butte < Frk *but "end" < Gmc, cf ON bútr "end, goal, target")
début
débutant
débutante
débutaniser
décaler "to bring forward"
décalage
décalé
décalotter
déchirer "to tear up"
déchirant
déchiré
déchirée
déchirant
déchirement
déchireur
déchirure
déclencher ( also déclancher)
déclenchement ( also déclanchement)
déclenche
déclencheur
déclic
décliquer
déclic
décliqueter
décocher
décochage
décochement
décoiffer "to remove the headdress of"
décoiffé
décramponner
décrier
décri
décrié
décrocher "to unhook"
décrochage
décroché
décrochement
décrocheur
décrochez-moi-çà
décrotter "to clean, brush off"
décrotteur
décrotteuse
décrottoir
défalquer "to subtract, deduct"
défalcation
défarder
défardé
déforestation
défraîchir
défraîchi
défrayer "to defray"
défraiement ( also défraîment, défrayement)
défricher
défrichage
défriché
défrichement
défricheur
défriper
défriser
défrisé
défrisement
défroncer
défroncement
défroquer "to unfrock"
défroque
défroqué
dégager "to redeem a pledge"
dégagé
dégagement
dégalonner
déganter
déganté
dégarnir "to strip"
dégarni
dégarnissement
dégât "damage"
dégâter
dégauchir
dégauchi
dégauchissage
dégauchissement
dégauchisseuse
dégazer
dégazage
dégingandé
dégingandée
dégivrer
dégivrage
dégivreur
déglinguer
déglingué
dégrafer "to unhook"
dégrafé
dégréer "to rig"
dégréement
dégriffer
dégrimer
dégringoler
dégringolade
dégringolant
dégriser "to sober up"
dégrisé
dégrisement
dégrossir
dégrossi
dégrossissage
dégrossissement
dégrouper
dégroupement
déguerpir "to quit"
déguerpissement
déguignonner
déguiser "to disguise"
déguisé
déguisement
déhaler
déhâler
déhancher
déhanché
déhanchement
déharnacher
déharnachement
déhonté "shameless"
déjauger
déjuc
déjucher
délabrer
délabré
délabrement
délaisser
délaissé
délaissement
délatter
délayer
délai "time" ( < OFr de- + laier "to leave" < Lat latare < Gmc, cf Goth lātan)
délaiement
délayage
délayant
délayé
délayement
délayure
délester
délestage
déloger "to dislodge"
délogement
déloqueté
déluré "disenchanted"
démaquiller
démaquillage
démaquillant
démarcation "demarcation"
démarchage
démarche "gait"
démarcheur
démarcheuse
démarquer "to unmark"
démarquage
démarqueur
démarrer "to unmoor"
démarrage
démarreur
démasquer
démasqué
démâter
démâtage
démâté
demi-aune
demi-bague
demi-bande
demi-bosse
demi-botte
demi-drap
demi-feutre
demi-gros
demi-haut
demi-hauteur
demi-hauteur à
demi-louis
demi-penny
demi-watt
démuseler
démuselé
dénantir
dépaqueter
dépaquetage
dépatouiller
dépiquer
dépiquage
dépocher
dépoter
dépotage
dépotement
dépoteyer
dépotoir
dérader ( < Eng road)
dérade
déralinguer
déranger "to displace, derange"
dérangé
dérangement
dérangeur
dérangeuse
déraper
dérapage
dérober "to rob, steal"
désarroi "disarray"
dessaisir "to dispossess, relinquish"
dessaissement
détacher "to detach"
détachement
détaler "to clear, pack up"
développer "to develop"
développable
développant
développante
développé
développée
développement
digue "an embankment"
endiguer
dock "dock"
dogue "dog"
dollar "dollar"
donjon
douelle "archivolt" ( < MFr douvelle, cf Germ döbel "peg, plug, dowel", Dut douwen "to push in")
douve "stave of casks" ( < MFr douvelle, cf Germ döbel "peg, plug, dowel", Dut douwen "to push in")
drageon (Bot.) "sucker"
drague "dredge" ( < Eng drag < ON draga < Gmc)
draguer
dragueur
drainer "to drain" ( < Eng drain < OE drēahnian < Gmc)
drainage
drap "cloth" ( < OFr < LL drappum < Gmc)
draper
drapier
draperie
drapeau "ensign" ( < drapeau "stuff, rag" < drap < Gmc)
drèche "malt"
drille "rag; drill; soldier"
drogue "drug"
droguiste
droguer
drogue "drogue"
drôle "droll; knave"
drôlerie
drôlesse
drôlatique
dune "dune, a down" ( < OFr < MDu dūna, dūne "dune, down" < Gmc, cf OE dūn "hill, down")
duvet

E
ébaucher "to sketch"
ébauche
ébauchoir
ébaudir "to frolic; make gay" ( < MFr baud "jolly" < *Frk bald "quick, bold" < Gmc, cf OE beald "bold")
éblouir "to dazzle" ( < LL *exblaudire < Frk blaudi < Gmc, cf OHG blōdi "weak, feeble" (Germ blöde))
éblouissement
ébranler "to shake" ( < branler < Gmc)
ébranlement
ébrécher "to impair, make a breach in"
ébrouer "to wash" ( < Gmc, cf Germ brühen)
écaille "scale, shell"
écailler
écaillère
écale "shell, hull"
écaler
écang (also écangue ) "scutching blade"
écanguer
écanguer "to scutch"
écangueur
écanguage
écangueuse
échafaud "scaffold"
échafaudage
échafauder
échanson "cupbearer"
écharpe "scarp"
échasse "tressel"
échassier
échevin "alderman, judge"
échevinage
échevinal
échine "spine"
échoppe "engraver"
échoppe "stall, shop"
éclat "fragment"
éclater "to fragment, splinter"
éclatant
éclisse "split wood"
écope "bailer"
écosser "to shell, husk"
écot "treebranch"
écot "share, scot"
écoute "sheet"
écran "screen"
écraser "to crush"
écrasement
écrevisse "crayfish"
écrou "scroll"
écume "foam"
écumer
écumeux
écumeur
écumoire
écurie "a stable"
efflanquer "to render lean"
effrayer "to frighten"
effroi "fright"
effroyable "frightful"
égard "regard"
égarer "to mislead"
égarement
égaré
égayer "to enliven"
égratigner "to scratch"
égratignure
éhonté "shameless"
élaguer "to prune"
élagage
élan "elan"
elfe
émail "enamel"
émailler
émailleur
embaucher "to seduce"
embauchage
embaucheur
emblaver "to sow corn" ( < ML imbladare < Frk < Gmc, cf OE blǣd "produce, crop, yield")
emblavure
embosser (Naut.) "to bring alongside of"
embraser "to set on fire" ( < MFr embraser < em- + braser "to set on fire" < ON < Gmc, cf Swed brasa "fire, pyre", Swed brasa "to roast", Dan brase)
embrasement
embrasure
embrasure "embrasure"
embrayer
embringuer
embrouiller "to confuse, embroil"
embuscade "ambuscade"
embusquée "ambuscade"
embusquer "to ambush"
emerillon "merlin"
émoi "anxiety"
émousser "to dull, make blunt"
empan "span"
empoter "to pot"
encaquer "to pack in barrels"
engageant "engaging"
engagement "engagement"
engager "to engage"
engraver "to embed in the sand"
engravement
enhardir "to embolden"
enjoliver "to adorn"
enjolivement
enjolivure
enjoliveur
enrichir "enrich"
entacher "to infect"
entasser "to heap up"
entassement
enticher "to spoil, defile"
entonner "to tun"
envelopper "to envelop"
enveloppant
enveloppe
enveloppé
enveloppement
enveloppeur
épar "beam" ( < Frk *sparro; OHG sparro)
épargner "to spare"
épargne
épater "to de-foot"
épeautre
épeler "to spell"
épellation
éperlan "smelt"
éperon "spur"
éperonner
épervier "sparrow-hawk"
épier "to spy"
épisser "to splice"
épissoire
épissure
épois "branches of an antler"
équiper "to equip"
équipe
équipage
équipée
équipement
érafler "to graze"
éraflure
escale (Nav.) "putting in"
escarcelle "purse"
escarmouche "skirmish"
escarpe "scarp"
escarper
escarpment
contrescarpe
escarpin "sock, slipper"
escarpolette "a swing"
escogriffe "bean-pole"
escrimer "to fence"
escrime
escroc "swindler"
escroquer
escroqueur
escroquerie
espiègle "frolicsome"
espièglerie
espion "a spy"
espionner
espionnage
-esque adjective suffix ( < It -esco < LL -iscus < Gmc, cf OE -isc)
esquif "skiff"
esquiver "to dodge, avoid"
est "east"
estacade "stockade"
estafier "foot-soldier; to bully"
estafilade "a gash, slash, cut"
estaminet "bistro, cafe"
estampe "stamp, print"
étampe
estampille "a stamp"
estamper "to stamp, print"
étamper
estampiller
estoc "a stick; sword"
estocade "stockade"
estompe "stump"
estrapade "strappado"
esturgeon "sturgeon"
étai "a stay, support"
étayer
étal "stall"
étaler
détaler
étaler "to present for sale"
étalage
étalagiste
étalon "stallion"
étalon "a standard measure"
étape "staples"
étau "vice"
étayer "to shore up"
étayement
étendard "standard, flag"
éteuf 
étiquette "label"
étiqueter
étoffe "stuff"
étoffer
étrave
étrier "stirrup"
étrique "scanty"
étrivière "leather strap"
étron
étui "case"
étuve "stove"
étuver
étuvée
étuviste

F
faille ″fabric, veil″  ( < Dut falie)
falaise "cliff"
falbala "furbelow" ( < Prov farbella "fringe" < Ital faldella "pleat" < falda "flap, fold" < Gmc, cf OHG faltan "to fold")
fange
fanon "flag"
faquin "puppy, rascal"
faquinerie
farandole "farandole"
fard "paint"
farder
faubourg "suburb"
faucon "falcon"
fauconneau
fauconnerie
fauconnier
fauteuil "arm-chair"
fauve "tawny, fallow"
fauvette
félon "felon" ( < OFr felun, obl. case of fel "traitor, wretch" < Frk *fillo, cf OS fillian "to whip, punish", OHG fillen "to whip, beat")
félonie
fer-blanc "tin plate"
ferblantier
ferme "farm" ( < OFr, < ML ferma, firma < OE feorm < Gmc)
fermage
fermette
fermier
fermière
feudataire "feudatory"
feudiste "feudist"
feurre "straw"
feutre "felt"
feutrer
feutrage
fi (interject.) "fie" ( < OFr fi < ON fy < Gmc)
fief "fief"
fieffé
fifre "fife"
filtre "filter"
filtrer
filtration
infiltre
firme "company, business firm" ( < ML firma < OE feorm < Gmc)
flacon "flagon, bottle"
flagorner ″to fawn on″
flammant "flamingo" ( < ML Flamingus "fleming" < Gmc *Flam-, cf OE Flæming, a native of Flanders)
flanc "flank, side" ( < OFr < Frk *hlanca < Gmc, cf OHG hlanca "loin")
flanquer
efflanqué
flandrin "lad"
flanelle "flannel"
flâner "to stroll" ( < Norm flanner < ON flana "to wander, go about" < Gmc)
flâneur
flaque "pool, puddle"
flatter "to flatter"
flatterie
flatteur
flèche "arrow"
flèche "a flitch of bacon"
fleuve "river" ( < OFr. Assumed to be a borrowing from < Lat fluvius, however, the form and meaning suggest a derivation from an earlier *floue, flouwe linking it to Frk *flōda "river, waterway to the sea, tidal flow" < Gmc *flōda, flōþuz "river, watercourse, ocean", cf OHG flōda, flōdu "river", ON flōð "river, waterway", Goth flōdus "river", OHG flouwan "to flow with water". Latin fluvius would have yielded *fluge in French (cf Lat leviarius > légère; Lat nivea, nivia > neige, etc.))
flint-glass "flintglass"
frichti 'snack, light meal' (< Alsacian fristick, standard German Frühstück)
flocon "flake" ( < Frk *flako < Gmc *flak-, cf MDu vlak "flat, level", Germ Flocke "flake", ON flak)
floconneux
flot "wave" ( < Frk *flot- < Gmc *fluto-, cf ON flota, OE flotian, MDu vloten "to float")
flotter
flottage
flottaison
flotter "to float"
flotte
flottille
flotteur
flou "gentleness of touch"
fluet
fluet "thin, lanky"
foc "jib-sail"
folklore
folklo
folklorique
folkloriste
forban "pirate" ( < forbannir < Frk *firbannjan < for- "for-" + bannjan "to ban" < Gmc, cf Dut verbannen)
forcené "lunatic, madman" ( < forsené < for + OFr sen "sense, judgement, reason" < Frk *sin < Gmc, cf OHG sin)
forêt "forest" ( < Frk *forhist, forhista < Gmc, cf OHG forhist, foreht, forst "forest", OE fyrhþ "forest, game reserve")
foresterie
forestier
forestièrement
foudre "a tun (for liquids)" ( < Germ fuder < Gmc)
foule "crowd" ( < OFr folc, fouc, fulc, foulc "people, crowd, multitude" < Frk *folc < Gmc, cf OE folc "folk". Influenced in form by unrelated verb fouler "to squeeze")
fourbe "cheating"
fourbir "to furbish" ( < OFr < Frk *furbjan < Gmc, cf OHG furban "to polish")
fourbissage
fourbissure
fourbisseur
fournir "to furnish"
fourniment
fournisseur
fourniture
fourrage "forage"
fourrager
fourragère
fourrageur
fourreau "case, frock"
fourrer "to stuff, poke"
fourrier "royal officer in charge of food"
fourrure "fur"
frac "frock"
frais "fresh"
fraîcheur
fraîchir
rafraîchir
frais "expense, cost"
défrayer
fraise "ruffle, curl" ( < fraiser "to frizzle, curl" < Prov frezar "to curl" < Gmc, cf OE frīs "curled", OFris frēsle "lock of hair")
fraiser
framboise "raspberry"
framboisier
framboiser
franc "a franc"
franc "free"
franchir
franchise
affranchir
français "a Frenchman"
franciser
francisation
franchir "to leap over"
franchise "franchise, permission, freedom"
francique "Frankish"
frapper "to hit, strike"
frappe
frappement
frappeur
frayeur "fright"
fredaine "frolic" ( < Prov fradin < Goth fraaiþeis < fra- "for-" + aiþeis, cf OHG freidic)
fredonner "to hum"
fredonnement
frelater "to adulterate" ( < Flem verlaten < Gmc)
frelateur
frelatage
frelon "hornet" ( < OFr frelun < Frk *hurslo, hruslo < Gmc, cf Dut horsel "hornet")
fresque "fresco"
fressure "plucking"
fret "freight"
fréter
fréteur
affréter
freux "rook"
friche "wasteland" ( < Frk *frisch < Gmc, cf Dut versch, virsch "fresh [expose of land]")
défricher
frimas "hoarfrost"
frimaire
fringale "hunger pang" ( < Norm frainvale < Gmc)
fringant "brisk, dapper" ( < fringuer "to get dressed, clean up" < Frk *hreinjan "to clean, tidy up" < Gmc, cf OHG hreinjan "to purify, clean up")
fringuer
fripe "rag"
fripier
friperie
friper "to rumple"
fripe ( also frippe)
fripon
frise "[cheval de frise], a military term"
friser "to frizz"
frisure
frison
frisotter
défriser
froc "frock"
frocard
défroque
défroquer
fronce
froncer "frown" (< Frk *hrunkja "wrinkle", cf Dut fronse, ronse "wrinkle", Ger Runzel "wrinkle")
froncer
défroncer
froncement

G
gabelle "gabel"
gabeleur
gabelou
gabeler
gabelage
gaber "to mock"
gâche "staple"
gâchette
gâcher "to bungle"
gâche
gâcheur
gâcheux
gâchis
gâchette "tumbler"
gaffe "boat-hook" ( < OFr < Prov gaf < Goth *gafa "hook" < Gmc *gafa, cf OE gaf)
gaffer
gage "pledge"
gagiste
gager "to wager, hire"
gage
gagerie
gageur
gageure
engager
dégager
gagnage "pasture"
gagner "to earn"
gain
gai "gay, blissful, blithe"
gaieté
égayer
gaieté "gaiety"
gaillard "strapping man, guy (gars)+hard"
gaillarde
gaillardise
ragaillardir
gain "earnings, profits"
gala "gala"
galant "gallant"
galanterie
galantin
galantiser
galbe "entour"
Gallois "Welsh"
galonner "to lace"
galon
galoper "to gallop"
galop
galopin
galopade
galoubet "flute" ( < galouber < *galauber "to play an instrument, play well" < Prov galaubeiar "to act well" < Goth galaubei "great value" < Gmc, cf Goth galaufs "invaluable")
galvauder "to throw into disorder"
gamin "street urchin"
gaminer
gaminerie
gangue "gangue"
gant "glove"
gantier
ganter
ganterie
ganteler
garance "madder" ( < Frk *wratja "madder" < Gmc, cf OHG rezza)
garancer
garant "guarantee, voucher"
garantir
garantie
garçon "boy, waiter" ( < OFr garçun "servant", oblique case of gars "boy, soldier" < Frk *warkiōn, wrakjōn, oblique case of warkiō, wrakjō < Gmc *wrakja, wrakjan-, cf OHG wrecheo "an exile", OE wrecca "stranger, exile", ON rekkr "man")
garder "to guard, keep, take care of" ( < OFr garder, guarder < Frk *wardōn < Gmc *wardo-, cf OHG wartēn "to watch over", OE weardian "to ward, guard")
gardeur
gardien "guardian" ( < OFr gardien, guarden < Frk *warding- < Gmc *wardo-)
gardon "roach" (fish)
gare "river basin"
garenne "warren"
garennier
garer "to dock"
gare
égarer
garnement "worthless fellow"
garnir "to garnish"
garniture
garnement
garnison
garnisaire
garni
garnison "garrison"
garniture "garnishing, furniture"
garou(loup) "werewolf"
garrot "club, big stick" ( < OFr guaroc < garokier "to obstruct" < Frk *wrokkōn "to twist, contort" & *wrok "knotty part of a tree" < Gmc, cf Dut wroegen "to torture, torment")
garrotter
gars "boy, guy" ( < OFr gars "boy, soldier" < Frk *warkiō, wrakjō < Gmc *wrakjan-, cf OHG wrecheo "an exile", OE wrecca "stranger, exile", ON rekkr "man")
gaspiller "to waste, throw into confusion, squander"
gaspilleur
gaspillage
gâteau "cake"
gâter "to ruin, spoil" ( < OFr gaster, guaster < Frk *wōstjan (infl by Lat 'vastare') < Gmc, cf OHG wuostan "to waste", OE wēstan "to waste")
dégât
gâtine "wasteland, moor"
gauche "left; left hand"
gaucher
gaucherie
gauchir
gauchir "to warp"
gauchissement
gaude "mignonette"
gaufre "wafer, waffle"
gaufrer
gaufrier
gaufrure
gaule "long pole" ( < MFr gaulle < OFr gaule < Frk *walu < Gmc, cf ON volr, Goth walus, OE walu)
gauler
Gaule "Gaul" ( < Frk *walha "outlanders, Romans, Celts" < Gmc *walhos, cf OE wealh "Welsh")
Gaulois
gaupe "slattern"
gaz "gas"
gazon "turf"
gazonner
gazonnement
gerbe "sheaf"
gerbée
gerber
gerfaut "gerfalcon"
gibelet "gimlet" ( < Ofr guimbelet < Frk < Gmc, cf MDu wimmelkijn)
gibet "gibbet" ( < OFr gibe "staff, club" < Frk *gibb "forked stick" < Gmc, cf Eng gib)
gibier (hunting) "game" ( < Frk *gabaiti < Gmc, cf OHG gebeize)
giboyer "to hunt"
giboyeur
giboyeux
gigot "leg of mutton"
gigue "leg"
gigue "jig"
giron "lap"
givre "frost"
glapir "to yelp"
glapissement
glette "litharge"
glisser "to slip"
glissoire
glissade
glisseur
glissement
glouteron (Bot.) "burdock"
goal "goal"
godailler "to tipple"
godaille
godet "drinking cup"
godron "godroon"
godronner
goguenard "banter"
goguenarder
goguenarderie
goguette "merry creature"
gonfalon "gonfalon"
gonfalonnier
gothique "Gothic"
gourgandine "street-walker" ( < Dial Fr gore, goure "quean" + gandire < Goth wandjan "to go, walk"
gourmade "punch, blow"
gourmand "gourmand"
gourmandise
gourmander "to scold"
gourmandise "gluttony"
gourme "mumps" ( < Frk *wurm, worm < Gmc, cf OHG wurm)
gourmé "curbed"
gourmer "to beat"
gourmette
gourmade
gourmet "gourmet"
gourmette "curb-chain"
grappe "bunch, hook"
grappiller
grappilleur
grappillon
grappin
égrapper
grappiller "to glean"
grappillon "cluster of grapes"
grappin "grapnel"
grateron (Bot.) "scratchweed"
gratin "burnt part of food"
gratter "to scratch"
grattelle
grateron
grattoir
gratin
égratigner
égratignure
graver "to engrave"
graveur
gravure
gravure "engraving"
gredin "scoundrel"
gredinerie
gréement "rigging"
gréer "to rig"
agrès
gréement
gréeur
grêle "hail" ( < OFr gresler < Frk *grisilōn "to hail" < Gmc)
grêlon
grêler
grelin "wallfish"
grêlon "hailstorm"
grelot "a bell"
grelotter "to shiver"
grès "sandstone"
grésil
gresserie
grésil "sleet"
grésiller
grésillement
griblette "hash of meat"
gribouiller "to scrawl, daub"
gribouillage
gribouillette
griffe "claw"
griffer
griffade
griffonner
griffonneur
griffonnage
grigner "to pucker"
grignoter
grignoter "to nibble"
grimace "grimace"
grimacer
grimacier
grimaud "urchin"
grime (Theat.) "dotard"
grimer
grimaud
grimper "to climb"
grincer "to gnash"
grincement
gripper "to seize, grip"
grippe
gris "grey"
grisâtre
grisaille
griser
grison
grisonner "to turn grey"
grommeler "to grumble"
groom "groom"
groseille "gooseberry"
groseillier
grouiller "to stir" ( < MFr grouller < MDu grollen < Gmc)
grouillement
group "bag of money"
groupe "group, cluster" ( < It gruppo "group, knot" < Germ kruppa < Gmc *kruppaz, cf OE cropp "bunch")
grouper
groupement
gruau "oatmeal"
gruger "to crunch"
gruyer (Feud.) "someone permitted to forest wood"
gruerie
gué "a ford" ( < Frk *wad < Gmc *wada-, cf OE wæd, OE wadan "to wade")
guéer
guéable
guéage
guéau
guède "wood"
guelte "pay, payment" ( < Germ Geld < Gmc)
guenipe
guenon
guenuche
guêpe "wasp" ( < MFr guespe < OFr wespe < Frk *waspa, wespa < Gmc, cf Dut wesp, Germ Wespe, OE wæsp)
guêper
guêpier
guêpière
guerdon "guerdon" ( < OFr gueredun < ML widerdonum "recompense" < Frk *widarlōn "reward" < Gmc)
guerdonner
guère "hardly" ( < Ofr guaires < Frk *waigaro "much" < Gmc, OHG weigiro "not very")
naguère
guérir "to heal"
guérison
guérissable
guérite "sentry box"
guerre "war" ( < OFr guerre < Frk *werra < Gmc *werso, cf OHG werra "strife, quarrel")
guerrier
guerroyer
aguerrir
guerroyer "to fight"
guerroyant
guerroyeur
guet "watch, wait, guard"
guet-apens
guêtre "a gaiter"
guetter "to watch, look out, lurk"
guet
guetteur
aguets
gueuse "cast-iron"
gueux "beggar" ( < MDu guit "rascal" < Gmc)
gui "mistletoe" ( < Frk *wihsila "mistletoe < Gmc)
guichet "wicket"
guichetier
guide "a guide"
guider
guidon
guider "to guide"
guigne (Bot.) "cherry"
guigner "to glance at"
guignon
guignon "bad luck"
Guillaume "William"
guilledou "place of ill repute"
guilleret "lively"
guimauve (Bot.) "mallow"
guimbarde "old crock"
guimpe "wimple"
guinder "to hoist oneself, exert"
guinguette "villa"
guipure "guipure"
guirlande "garland"
enguirlander
guise "manner, way"
déguiser

See also
 History of French
 Old Frankish
 Franks
 List of Spanish words of Germanic origin
 List of Portuguese words of Germanic origin
 List of Galician words of Germanic origin
 List of French words of Gaulish origin

Notes

References
Auguste Brachet, An Etymological Dictionary of the French Language: Third Edition
Auguste Scheler, "Dictionnaire d'étymologie française d'après les résultats de la science moderne" 
Centre National de Ressources Textuelles et Lexicales 
Dictionary.com
Friedrich Diez, "An Etymological Dictionary of the Romance Languages"
Dossier des Latinistes, La Greffe Germanique 

French Germanic
Germanic C